Hwang Jun-ho (born 4 May 1998) is a South Korean footballer currently playing as a defender for Busan IPark.

Career statistics

Club

References

1998 births
Living people
South Korean footballers
Association football defenders
K League 2 players
Busan IPark players